Michael Francis Skerry (January 3, 1908 – September 28, 1989) was a Massachusetts legislator; he served in the Massachusetts House of Representatives for six terms, from 1941–1957, and was the speaker from 1955 to 1957. Skerry served as delegate from the 8th District of Middlesex County to the Democratic National Convention from Massachusetts in 1944 and again in 1956. Michael Skerry began his political career in 1936 when he was elected to the Medford Board of Aldermen, representing Ward 1 for four years.
After leaving the Massachusetts Legislature, Skerry served as clerk of the Malden District Court from 1957 to 1978. Michael Skerry died on September 30, 1989.

The personal papers of Michael Skerry which document his career in the Massachusetts House of Representatives from 1955-1959 are contained in the John F. Kennedy Library National Archives and Records Administration, Boston Massachusetts.

See also
 Massachusetts legislature: 1941–1942, 1943–1944, 1945–1946, 1947–1948, 1949–1950, 1951–1952, 1953–1954, 1955–1956

References

John F. Kennedy Library National Archives
UNLV Libraries Wilbur and Toni Clark Collection

External links
John F. Kennedy Library National Archives
Massachusetts Delegation 1944 Democratic Convention
Massachusetts Delegation 1956 Democratic Convention

1908 births
1989 deaths
Massachusetts city council members
Speakers of the Massachusetts House of Representatives
Members of the Massachusetts House of Representatives
Politicians from Medford, Massachusetts
20th-century American politicians